Robert Altomare (October 30, 1938 – April 28, 2012), known professionally as Bobby Alto, was an American actor, comedian and performer.  He and Buddy Mantia made up the Brooklyn-based comedy team Alto & Mantia. They performed on both The Tonight Show Starring Johnny Carson (original air date September 6, 1971) and Toast of the Town with Ed Sullivan (original air date October 20, 1968).  Alto and Mantia also teamed with Marvin Braverman as the comedy team The Untouchables.

Career 
Alto's motion picture credits included Love Is All There Is (1996), Crocodile Dundee (1986), Prince of the City (1981) and The Death Collector (1976).  He also appeared in a 1992 episode of NBC's Law & Order and several television commercials throughout his career.  On Broadway, Alto was a lead performer in the 1992 production of 3 From Brooklyn which performed at the Helen Hayes Theatre in New York City.  He also starred in the original Broadway production of Lovers and Other Strangers, which led to the 1970 Academy Award-nominated film of the same name.

Along with comedy partner Buddy Mantia, Alto was the lead vocalist on the song "It's a Super-Spectacular Day", recorded in 1980.  The song was originally aired on The Dr. Demento Show prior to being picked up and distributed as a 7" single by MAD Magazine.

Death 
Robert Altomare died on April 28, 2012, following complications from a stroke suffered in 2010.  He is survived by his wife, Melody, and two daughters, Ivy and Kimberly.

Filmography

Film

Television

Notes

External links

American male film actors
American male television actors
People from Brooklyn
Male actors from New York City
1938 births
2012 deaths
20th-century American male actors
20th-century American comedians
21st-century American comedians
Comedians from New York City